Foster High School can refer to:

Foster High School (Fort Bend County, Texas)
Foster High School (Tukwila, Washington)